Forbes Park is a multi-use development in Chelsea, Massachusetts. It comprises  along the Chelsea River and Mill Creek. 

It will include around 300 hybrid lofts with retail and creative commercial space. The primary power source will be a 600 kW wind turbine and solar arrays generating over half of the site's power. Rain will be harvested in over 1,000,000 gallons of broad, open canals to supply water for the toilets. 

One very uncommon, but historically proven efficiency feature is the use of passive cooling. There is no air conditioning in the buildings. They all have special windows creating air scoops and the building and units have been designed to amplify the natural air flow to cool the units even on humid days.

External links
 Forbes Park
 Boston Business Journal Article 2011-02-11 "Ambitious Chelsea condo project in limbo"

Chelsea, Massachusetts
Neighborhoods in Massachusetts
Populated places in Suffolk County, Massachusetts